Choy sum (also spelled choi sum, choi sam in Cantonese; cai xin, caixin  in Standard Mandarin) is a leafy vegetable commonly used in Chinese cuisine. It is a member of the genus Brassica of the mustard family, Brassicaceae (Brassica rapa var. parachinensis or Brassica chinensis var. parachinensis). Choy sum is a transliteration of the Cantonese name, which can be literally translated as "heart of the vegetable". It is also known as Chinese flowering cabbage.

Description
Choy sum is a green leafy vegetable similar to gai lan, and can be characterized by the distinct yellow flowers which it bears. Fruits can develop out of cross-pollination or self-pollination, and are silique structured, that open at maturity through dehiscence or drying to bare open to brown or black seeds that are small and round in shape. A single pod can bear 4 to 46 seeds.

The height of the plant varies greatly, ranging from  depending on the growing conditions and the variety.

The whole plant is overall an annual, herbaceous plant, rarely perennial, rarely growing into subshrubs. The whole plant consists of a simple or branched (when it is near the flowering stage), leafy structure. It grows best in soil with a minimum pH level of 5.6, maximum pH level of 7.5.

Gallery

See also 
 List of leaf vegetables
 Bok choy

References

Brassica
Cantonese cuisine
East Asian vegetables
Leaf vegetables